Wildcat is an upcoming biographical film of American novelist Flannery O'Connor, co-written, directed and produced by Ethan Hawke. Co-written by Shelby Gaines and produced by Renovo Media Group, it is set to star Maya Hawke, Laura Linney, Vincent D'Onofrio and Steve Zahn.

Cast
Maya Hawke as Flannery O'Connor
Laura Linney as Regina
Rafael Casal as O.E. Parker
Steve Zahn
Cooper Hoffman as Manley Pointer
Willa Fitzgerald
Alessandro Nivola
Vincent D'Onofrio
Philip Ettinger as Cal Lowell

Production 
Renovo Media Group is fully financing the biopic of Flannery O'Connor and provide producer Cory Pyle and executive producers Eric Groth and David Kingland. Production also comes from Joe Goodman of Good Country Pictures, Ryan Hawke and Ethan Hawke of Under the Influence Productions, and Kevin Downes and Jon Erwin and Daryl Lefever of Kingdom Story Company. Maya Hawke from Under the Influence Productions is listed as an executive producer. Ethan Hawke was reported to have used his Instagram to say “Maya has been working hard for years to put this project together, and we’re grateful for the opportunity to introduce a new generation of filmgoers to the genius of Flannery O’Connor… Her work explores themes important to all artists — the intersection of creativity and faith, the blurred relationship between imagination and reality.”

In January 2023 it was revealed that joining Maya Hawke in the cast are Laura Linney, Philip Ettinger, Rafael Casal, Steve Zahn, Cooper Hoffman, Willa Fitzgerald, Alessandro Nivola, and Vincent D’Onofrio.
 
Principal photography began on 10 January, 2023 in Louisville, Kentucky. Filming was also scheduled for Shelbyville and Frankfort in central Kentucky.

References

External links
 Films shot in Louisville, Kentucky
Upcoming films
American drama films
2020s drama films
2020s English-language films
2020s American films